Julien Delocht (born 21 February 1942) is a Belgian racing cyclist. He rode in the 1966 Tour de France.

Major results
Sources:

1965
 5th Overall Tour de l'Avenir
 7th Brussel-Liege
1966
 3rd Overall GP du Midi-Libre
 4th GP Orchies
 4th Primus Classic
1967
 1st Circuit Dunkerque
 4th GP Petit Varois
 4th GP Cannes
 7th Omloop Het Volk
 8th Omloop der Zennevallei
1968
 1st Circuit de Niel
 1st Stage 4 (TTT) Paris–Nice
 3rd GP Stad Vilvoorde
 9th Polder-Kemper
1969
 2nd Omloop het Waasland
 4th Grand Prix Cerami
 7th Circuit de Niel
 8th Flèche Hesbignonne
 10th Kessel–Lier
1970
 2nd Kessel–Lier
 2nd Brussel-Bievene
 4th 1. Meiprijs – V. Bruyne
 8th Omloop der Zennevallei
 8th Tour de Wallonie
 10th Omloop van Midden-België

References

External links
 

1942 births
Living people
Belgian male cyclists
Place of birth missing (living people)